Olmeneta is a comune (municipality) in the Province of Cremona in the Italian region Lombardy, located about  southeast of Milan and about  north of Cremona.

Olmeneta borders the following municipalities: Casalbuttano ed Uniti, Castelverde, Corte de' Cortesi con Cignone, Pozzaglio ed Uniti, Robecco d'Oglio.

San Giovanni Battista is the Roman Catholic parish church of the town.

Transportation 
Olmeneta has a railway station which is a junction of the lines Brescia–Cremona and Treviglio–Cremona.

References

Cities and towns in Lombardy